Wassa Akropong is a big city and is the capital of Wassa Amenfi East Municipal in the Western Region of Ghana .

References

s

Populated places in the Western Region (Ghana)